Bourgeois revolution is a term used in Marxist theory to refer to a social revolution that aims to destroy a feudal system or its vestiges, establish the rule of the bourgeoisie, and create a bourgeois state. In colonised or subjugated countries, bourgeois revolutions often take the form of a war of national independence. The Dutch, English, American, and French revolutions are considered the archetypal bourgeois revolutions, in that they attempted to clear away the remnants of the medieval feudal system, so as to pave the way for the rise of capitalism. The term is usually used in contrast to "proletarian revolution", and is also sometimes called a "bourgeois-democratic revolution".

Theories of Bourgeois revolution 

According to one version of the two-stage theory, bourgeois revolution was asserted to be a necessary step in the move toward socialism, as codified by Georgi Plekhanov. In this view, countries that had preserved their feudal structure, like Russia, would have to establish capitalism via a bourgeois revolution before being able to wage a proletarian revolution. At the time of the Russian Revolution, the Mensheviks asserted this theory, arguing that a revolution led by bourgeoisie was necessary to modernise society, establish basic freedoms, and overcome feudalism, which would establish the conditions necessary for socialism.

Neil Davidson believes that the establishment of democracy or the end of feudal relations are neither defining characteristics of bourgeois revolutions, but instead supports Alex Callinicos' definition of bourgeois revolution as being those that establish "an independent center of capital accumulation".

Other theories describe the evolution of the bourgeoisie as not needing a revolution. The German bourgeoisie during the 1848 revolution did not strive to take command of the political effort and instead sided with the crown. Davidson attributes their behaviour to the late development of capitalist relations and uses this as the model for the evolution of the bourgeoisie.

The goals of the Bourgeois revolution 
According to the Marxist view, the tasks of the bourgeois revolution include:

 The creation of the nation state (which can be constituted differently in different peoples).
 The constitution of the state on the basis of popular sovereignty (the rule of law is based on a constitution adopted by the people).
 Bourgeois rule if possible in the form of a democratic republic (which, however, already found its complement in tyranny in antiquity).
 The abolition of serfdom, and the formation of free wage workers instead.
 The separation of producers from the means of production in primitive accumulation.
 The abolition of the guilds and freedom of investment.
 The free development of the productive forces until they are ripe for social revolution.

Bourgeois revolutions in history

Bourgeois revolutions in the middle ages 
Although with much less diffusion, some social movements of the European Late Middle Ages have also received the name of bourgeois revolution, in which the bourgeoisie begins to define itself in the nascent cities as a social class.

Bourgeois revolutions in the early modern period 
The first wave of bourgeois revolutions are those that occurred within the early modern period and were typically marked by being driven from below by the petty bourgeoisie against absolutist governments.

  The German Peasants' War (1524–1525) has been labelled by later historians as an early attempt at a bourgeois revolution.
  The Eighty Years' War, also known as the Dutch revolution, (1566–1648)
  English revolution (1640–1660)
  American revolution (1765–1791)
  French revolution (1789–1799)

Bourgeois revolutions in the late modern period 
The second wave of bourgeois revolutions are those that occurred within the late modern period and were typically marked by being led from above by the haute bourgeoisie.
  French July Revolution (1830)
  French February Revolution (1848)
  German revolutions of 1848–1849
  Revolutions of 1848 in the Italian states
  Hungarian Revolution of 1848
  Philippine Revolution (1896–1898)
  1905 Russian Revolution (1905–1907)
  Persian Constitutional Revolution (1905–1911)
  Young Turk Revolution (1908)
  Chinese revolution of 1911 (1911–1912)
  Mexican Revolution (1910–1917)

References

Bibliography 

 
 
 
 
 
 
 
 
 
 

Marxist terminology
Revolution terminology
Revolutions by type
Bourgeoisie